Chu Fang-yi (born 30 August 1989) is a Taiwanese footballer who plays as a goalkeeper. She has been a member of the Chinese Taipei women's national team.

References

1989 births
Living people
Women's association football goalkeepers
Taiwanese women's footballers
Footballers from Taipei
Chinese Taipei women's international footballers
Asian Games competitors for Chinese Taipei
Footballers at the 2018 Asian Games